Akkala Sámi was a Sámi language spoken in the Sámi villages of A´kkel,  Ču´kksuâl and Sââ´rvesjäu´rr, in the inland parts of the Kola Peninsula in Russia. Formerly erroneously regarded as a dialect of Kildin Sámi, it has recently become recognized as an independent Sámi language that is most closely related to its western neighbor Skolt Sámi.

Akkala Sámi was noted as extinct in the 2010 UNESCO Atlas of the World's Languages in Danger. Previously, it had been considered the most endangered Eastern Sámi language. On December 29, 2003, Maria Serginathe last fluent native speaker of Akkala Sámidied. However, as of 2011 there were at least two people, both aged 70, with some knowledge of Akkala Sámi. Remaining ethnic Akkala Sámi live in the village Yona.

Although there exists a description of Akkala Sámi phonology and morphology, a few published texts, and archived audio recordings, the Akkala Sámi language remains among the most poorly documented Sámi languages. .  One of the few items in the language are chapters 23–28 of the Gospel of Matthew published in 1897.  It was translated by A. Genetz, and printed at the expense of the British and Foreign Bible Society.

In the Russian 2020 census, 1 person still claimed knowledge of Akkala.

Morphology
The following overview is based on Pekka (Pyotr) M. Zaykov's volume. Zaykov's Uralic phonetic transcription is retained here. The middle dot ˑ denotes palatalization of the preceding consonant, analyzed by Zaykov as semisoft pronunciation.

Noun
Akkala Sámi has eight cases, singular and plural: nominative, genitive-accusative, partitive, dative-illative, locative, essive, comitative and abessive. Case and number are expressed by a combination of endings and consonant gradation:
 Nominative: no marker in the singular, weak grade in the plural.
 Genitive-accusative: weak grade in the singular, weak grade + -i in the plural.
 Partitive: this case exists only in the singular, and has the ending -.
 Dative-illative: strong grade + -a, -a͕ or -ɛ in the singular, weak grade + -i in the plural.
 Locative: weak grade + -st, -śtˑ in the singular, weak grade + -nˑ in the plural.
 Essive: this case exists only in the singular: strong grade + -nˑ.
 Comitative: weak grade + -nˑ in the singular, strong grade + -, - or - in the plural.
 Abessive: weak grade + -ta in the singular.

Pronoun
The table below gives the declension of the personal pronouns  ‘I’ and  ‘we’. The pronouns  ‘you (sg.)’ and  ‘(s)he’ are declined like , the pronouns  ‘you (pl.)’ and  ‘they’ are declined like .

The interrogative pronouns  ‘what?’ and  ‘who?’ are declined as follows:

The proximal demonstrative  ‘this’ and the medial demonstrative  ‘that’ are declined as follows:

Verb

Akkala Sámi verbs have three persons and two numbers, singular and plural. There are three moods: indicative, imperative and conditional; the potential mood has disappeared. Below, the paradigm of the verbs  ‘to walk’ and  ‘to knit’ is given in the present and imperfect tense:

The verb  ‘to be’ conjugates as follows:

Compound tenses such as perfect and pluperfect are formed with the verb  in the present or imperfect as auxiliary, and the participle of the main verb. Examples are  ‘I have known’ from  ‘to know’, and  ‘(s)he had made’ from  ‘to make’.

The conditional mood has the marker -č, which is added to the weak grade of the stem:  ‘I would sew’,  ‘you (sg.) would become tired’.

As in other Sámi languages, Akkala Sámi makes use of a negative verb that conjugates according to person and number, while the main verb remains unchanged. The conjugation of the negative verb is shown here together with the verb  ‘to begin’:

References

External links

KOLTAN- JA KUOLANLAPIN SANAKIRJA (Kola Sámi dictionary, includes Akkala)

Sámi in Russia
Eastern Sámi languages
Languages of Russia
Extinct languages of Europe
Languages extinct in the 2000s